Rubén Rivera Corral (born 3 May 1985) is a Spanish professional footballer who plays for Atlético Coruña Montañeros CF as a forward.

Club career
Rivera was born in A Coruña, Galicia. A product of Deportivo de La Coruña's youth academy, he appeared only once for its first team in the league, featuring 33 minutes in a 0–0 La Liga home draw against Levante UD on 18 February 2007. He scored once in the Copa del Rey for them, in the 4–1 home victory over Real Valladolid in the quarter-finals.

Subsequently, Rivera all but competed in the Spanish lower leagues, mainly with neighbouring Montañeros CF. From 2012 to 2014 he played in the Austrian Football Bundesliga, in representation of Wolfsberger AC and FC Admira Wacker Mödling.

Rivera returned to his country in 2014 January transfer window, signing for Segunda División B club CD Leganés on loan. In the following years, he represented a host of teams at that level but also in Tercera División.

References

External links

1985 births
Living people
Spanish footballers
Footballers from A Coruña
Association football forwards
La Liga players
Segunda División B players
Tercera División players
Divisiones Regionales de Fútbol players
Deportivo Fabril players
Deportivo de La Coruña players
CD Leganés players
Real Avilés CF footballers
Coruxo FC players
CD Boiro footballers
Austrian Football Bundesliga players
Wolfsberger AC players
FC Admira Wacker Mödling players
Spanish expatriate footballers
Expatriate footballers in Austria
Spanish expatriate sportspeople in Austria